Franco Ferreiro and André Sá won the title, after won against Uladzimir Ignatik and Martin Kližan 6–2, 6–4 in the final.

Seeds

Draw

Draw

References
 Main Draw

Aberto de Bahia - Doubles
Sport in Salvador, Bahia